Billings is a township in the Canadian province of Ontario, as well as the name of a community within that township.

Located in the Manitoulin District, the township had a population of 603 in the Canada 2016 Census.

Communities
The primary community in the township is Kagawong. There are three smaller communities: Billings, Bowser's Corner, and Pleasant Valley.

Kagawong
Kagawong's harbour is located on Mudge Bay and is home to the Kagawong Lighthouse, which has been in continuous service since 1888. The name Kagawong means "where mists rise from falling waters" in the Ojibwe language, a reference to the nearby Bridal Veil Falls on the Kagawong River.

Kagawong is home to numerous tourist attractions. The most popular being the famed Bridal Veil Falls.  The legend is that those who swim under the falls are rewarded with good luck.  The falls begin at the end of the upper Kagawong river, and flow past a series of small, cascading waterfalls down a winding trail towards Mudge Bay.  The trails are spotted with art pieces, benches and picnic tables.  In addition to the falls, Kagawong is also home to a Transportation and Communication Museum, Art Gallery, Anglican Church, several sandy beaches, and many camping and cottage rental opportunities.

Kagawong is the nearest port of call to the islands of the North Channel, being directly south of Clapperton Island and the Benjamin Islands.

Demographics

Transportation

Highway 540 is the main road in the township and provides connections to Gore Bay and Mindemoya.

See also
List of townships in Ontario

References

External links

Municipalities in Manitoulin District
Single-tier municipalities in Ontario
Township municipalities in Ontario
Communities in Manitoulin Island
1884 establishments in Ontario